Tear the Roof Off: 1974-1980  is a 2-CD compilation album by the funk group Parliament featuring songs recorded for Casablanca Records during the band's career with that label from 1974 to 1980. The compilation was released in 1993. The compilation includes some single edits and extended 12-inch single edits of selected songs, but no previously unreleased material, except for a slightly longer version of "Testify" that restores a deleted guitar introduction. The CD booklet contains historical articles from music writers Greg Tate and Tom Vickers, who served as the band's Minister of Information from 1976 until 1980.

Track listing

References

External links
The Motherpage

Parliament (band) compilation albums
1993 compilation albums